Experiential retail or experiential commerce is a type of retail marketing whereby customers coming into a physical retail space are offered experiences beyond the traditional ones (such as in a clothing store: browsing merchandise, advice from live human salespeople, dressing rooms and cashiers). Amenities provided may include art (often interactive art), live music, virtual reality, cafés and lounges, and large video display walls.

Theory
As of 2019, the target market for experiential commerce is chiefly Millennials, who are (supposedly, according to "studies") as a group overall less materialistic than previous generations and prone to spend relatively more of their disposable income on services - for example wellness and gyms. This supposed spending pattern is disputed by the Federal Reserve.

Even where there is a product consumed, such as at Starbucks and its competitors, customers are paying more "because of the experience", not (only) because it might be a better product than at a diner, for example. Apple Stores purport to provide not only a superior product but an "experience" and a "gathering space" or "Town Square" as well.

E-commerce retailers such as Casper, Harry's and b8ta have a limited number of experiential physical stores or spaces where their products can not only be viewed but experienced.

Many of these brand-promoting experiential spaces are, at the same time, addressing the Millennials' reported tendency to be more brand-loyal than previous generations who shopped more for relatively more interchangeable products and services on price.

Examples
Examples of experiential retail and experiential commerce are:

 House of Vans in London, U.K., a  space with a concrete mini-ramp, and street course for skateboards, cinema, café, live music venue and art gallery
 Escape rooms
 Farfetch pop-up stores in the U.K. for online retailers of high-end apparel
 IKEA events where customers could spend the night in their warehouse in Essex, England and were given massages, could select their bed linens and received sleep and mattress consultations from a sleep expert.
 Selfie museums, where visitors are encouraged to interact with exhibits and pose for photographs.
 Space Ninety 8, an offshoot of Urban Outfitters that sells merchandise, has yoga classes, album signings, art classes, and other social space.
 TOMS, a shoe company that placed virtual reality headsets into 100 stores "virtually transporting" them to Peru to see the impact of a social campaign.

Experiential commerce encompasses experiential retail but also may be purely virtual experiences or not connected to any semi-permanently or otherwise established space owned by a brand, for example:
 Airbnb "Experiences" platform offering lodging combined with experiences in cities 
 Red Bull that spent $65 million to, with the help of agency MediaMonks, drop the Austrian daredevil Felix Baumgartner out of a space balloon, and live streamed it

References

Retail formats
Marketing